A Riesenflugzeug (plural Riesenflugzeuge, German for "giant aircraft"), sometimes colloquially referred to in English as an R-plane, was any member of a class of large World War I German bombers, possessing at least three aircraft engines, although usually four or more engines. These were large multi-engine aircraft capable of flying several hours with larger bomb loads than the smaller  Grossflugzeug bombers such as the Gotha G.V.

Some of the earliest Riesenflugzeuge were given G-type designations before being redesignated, but a major distinction was that the requirements for the R-type specified that the engines had to be serviceable in flight. As a result, designs fell into two groups - those with the engines mounted centrally inside the fuselage using gearboxes and driveshafts to transfer the power to propellers mounted between the wings, and those with conventional powerplant installations mounted in large nacelles or the nose of the aircraft where engineers would be stationed for each group of engines. The transmission of power from the centrally mounted engines to the remote, most often wing-mounted propellers proved troublesome in practice and most operational examples of Riesenflugzeug-class aircraft were of the second type, as with the all-direct-drive Zeppelin-Staaken R.VI.

The Idflieg (Inspektion der Fliegertruppen (Inspection of the Air Force), the German Army department responsible for military aviation), assigned the letter R to this type of aircraft, which would then be followed by a period and a Roman numeral type number. Seaplanes were denoted by the addition of a lower case "s" after the "R" in the designation.

It was not until sixteen years later that an aircraft with a larger wingspan, the Soviet Tupolev Maksim Gorky eight-engined monoplane was built with a  wingspan.

The Riesenflugzeuge were operational from 1915 to 1919 and most of them were built as "one-off" aircraft.

List of aircraft

References

Notes

Citations

Bibliography

External links
 Brief contemporary technical description of the Dornier Rs.III or Rs.IV, with rough diagrams.
"The Four-engine Giant" Notes on German Bombers in 1918 issue of Flight
"The Linke-Hofmann Giant Machines", p.2, p.3 & p.4 in 1919 issue of Flight
"The German D.F.W. Commercial Four-Engined Biplane", p.2, p.3, p.4 & p.5 in 1919 issue of Flight
1910s German bomber aircraft
Flyingmachines.ru's photo page of many WW I German R-class bombers